Sergei Movsesian (born 3 November 1978) is an Armenian chess player. He was awarded the title Grandmaster by FIDE in 1997. He was a member of the gold medal-winning Armenian team at the 2011 World Team Chess Championship in Ningbo.

Movsesian played for the Czech Republic for most of his career. Later he represented Slovakia, which offered him citizenship. On December 30, 2010 Movsesian started to represent his ancestral country of Armenia.

Career
In 1998 Movsesian won the Czech Chess Championship. In 1999, he reached the quarterfinals of the FIDE World Chess Championship, held in Las Vegas, and lost to Vladimir Akopian by a score of 1½–2½. Movsesian competed in the FIDE World Championship also in 2000, 2002 and 2004.

In 2002 and 2007 he won the Slovak Chess Championship. In 2002 Movsesian also became the European blitz chess champion in Panormo, Crete.

He won international tournaments in Sarajevo, Bosna (2002 and 2007, both outright), at that time a strong closed GM tournament; 2007 Czech Coal Carlsbad Jubilee tournament in Karlovy Vary (joint with Ruslan Ponomariov); Mikhail Chigorin Memorial in Saint Petersburg in 2007; and the Wijk aan Zee Corus B tournament in 2008, a full point ahead of Nigel Short and Etienne Bacrot. At the 2008 European Individual Chess Championship, held in Plovdiv, Movsesian finished in a tie for 2nd–10th places. He won the playoffs to take the silver medal. In the 2013 edition of the same event he tied for 1st–8th with Alexander Moiseenko, Evgeny Romanov, Alexander Beliavsky, Constantin Lupulescu, Francisco Vallejo Pons, Hrant Melkumyan, Ian Nepomniachtchi, Alexey Dreev and Evgeny Alekseev. Movsesian was part of the Armenian team that took the bronze medal in the 2015 World Team Championship in Tsaghkadzor.

Personal life
Born in Tbilisi, Georgia, Movsesian has been living in the Czech Republic since 1994. In 2003 he married WGM Petra Krupková. He is now married to WGM Júlia Kočetková. He can speak eight languages.

Books

References

External links 

Grandmaster Games Database - Sergei Movsesian

Biography of Sergey Movsesian. Corus Chess 2009.

1978 births
Living people
Chess grandmasters
Armenian chess players
Chess players from Georgia (country)
Czech chess players
Slovak chess players
Chess Olympiad competitors
Chess writers
Sportspeople from Tbilisi
Armenian expatriate sportspeople in the Czech Republic
Slovak people of Georgian descent
Czech people of Georgian descent
Georgian people of Armenian descent
Slovak people of Armenian descent
Soviet chess players